The Council of Manzikert (or Manazkert) met in 726 to reconcile the Armenian Apostolic and Syriac Orthodox churches. It was convoked by the Armenian catholicos John of Odzun and attended by many Armenian bishops and six bishops of the Syriac church sent by Patriarch Athanasius III. It took place in Manzikert (Manazkert).

Both the Armenian church and the Syriac were miaphysite in their theology and rejected the Council of Chalcedon (451). In the canons of the council, the Armenians anathematized both the aphthartodocetists (who believed that Jesus' body was incorruptible) and some of the more heretical followers of Severus of Antioch (who although Orthodox in his Christology, some of his followers were not) in favour of the moderate formulation of Cyril of Alexandria. The council formally withdrew the Armenian church from communion with the Greek Orthodox church. It affirmed that Christ was true God, only-begotten Son, a single hypostasis and a single nature of the incarnate Word. While his human body was capable of pain and suffering, "of his divine nature he was above suffering". This formulation was arguably consistent with Chalcedon (if taken in light of the Second Council of Constantinople). This Council also led to the canonization and re-acceptance of Severus of Antioch for the Armenians. The council also addressed the rise of the Paulicians.

The Syriac church, which disagreed with many distinctive Armenian customs, was not entirely pleased with the outcome at Manzikert, but accepted communion with the Armenians nonetheless. The canons of Manzikert are often credited with confirming the Armenian church in its distinctive non-Chalcedonian theology and setting it apart from other churches. After the council, Armenian Chalcedonism was suppressed.

References

726
Armenian Apostolic Church
History of Oriental Orthodoxy
8th-century church councils